The men's doubles badminton event at the 2014 Commonwealth Games will be held from July 29 to August 3 at the Emirates Arena in Glasgow.

Seeds 
The seeds for the tournament were:

The gold medalists for this event were not seeded.

Draw

Key

 INV = Tripartite invitation
 IP = ITF place
 Alt = Alternate
 w/o = Walkover
 r = Retired
 d = Defaulted

Finals

Top Half

Section 1

Section 2

Bottom Half

Section 3

Section 4

References

Mens Doubles